Fallsview Indoor Waterpark is located on 5685 Falls Avenue in Niagara Falls, Ontario, Canada.

General information
The waterpark officially opened on 8 May 2006. There is a water oasis spanning  that features high-speed water slides among other water-related attractions. An interactive Atlantis-themed aquatic play area, along with an indoor wave pool and six swimming pools including multiple activity areas for water-related sports can be found on the premises. There is also an outdoor activity pool open year-round. Other attractions include a jungle-style beach for children to play in, a beach club-style restaurant and a bar. This waterpark is located on the top level of Casino Niagara's parking garage and has been consistently compared to similar waterparks in Ohio and Indiana and was judged to be superior. The waterpark has managed to enjoy its reputation as one of the cleanest and most spacious waterpark in North America.

Located near Clifton Hill, people of all ages can dry off and enjoy the land-based museums and attractions that can be accessed within walking distance of the waterpark.

Fallsview Indoor Waterpark was closed for most of 2020 due to the COVID-19 pandemic.

Slides and Attractions
Extreme Racing Slides (Thunder, Kamakazi, Drop Canyon, Sky Screamer)
Toob Tower
Canadian Plunge
Tidal Wave
Sunnyside Patio & Pool
Horseshoe Hot Springs
Beach House (Niagara Tipping Bucket, Fallsview Beach, Tiny Tots Splash Park)
The Beach Club

References

2006 establishments in Ontario
Buildings and structures in Niagara Falls, Ontario
Water parks in Canada
Tourist attractions in Niagara Falls, Ontario